Agincourt is a neighbourhood and former village in Toronto, Ontario, Canada. Agincourt is located in northeast Toronto, along Sheppard Avenue between Kennedy and Markham Roads (north-south includes lands between Highway 401 and Finch Avenue). It is officially recognized by the City of Toronto as occupying the neighbourhoods of Agincourt South–Malvern West and Agincourt North.

The name Agincourt is often used to refer to a larger area of northwest Scarborough rather than just the officially recognized neighbourhood. The area to the west of Agincourt, officially named Tam O'Shanter–Sullivan is often included as part of Agincourt, and the Agincourt Mall is located in Tam O'Shanter.

The section of Agincourt west of Midland Avenue belongs to the electoral district of Scarborough—Agincourt, while the section to the east is part of Scarborough North (federal, previously Scarborough—Rouge River) or Scarborough—Rouge River (provincial, until the 2018 provincial election, when it will be replaced with Scarborough North).

History

Agincourt was once referred to as "hero town" by the citizens that lived there. The village of Agincourt was officially founded with the establishment of the Agincourt post office, opened in June 1858 by John Hill. The name of the settlement was after the site of Henry V's decisive English victory over French forces in 1415. Local legend has it that the town's name was chosen when Hill requested that the town be given a post office, and the French-Canadian Postmaster agreed, on the condition that it be given a French name, with 'Agincourt' chosen to undermine the Postmaster's intention. The site of the 1415 battle is now known as Azincourt: the namesake of today's Agincourt, Ontario should not be confused with Agincourt, Meurthe-et-Moselle.  The original crossroads of Agincourt is located at Midland Avenue and Sheppard and served a rural agricultural population.

A Presbyterian church (from France) was built on the north-east corner, which is today's Knox United Church. In addition, an Agincourt Public School was built in 1914, which has evolved over time into Agincourt Junior Public School. A secondary school that later evolved into Agincourt Collegiate Institute, was established in 1915 on the second floor of the same building. From 1954 to 1998, the schools were a part of the Scarborough Board of Education.

Two railway stations were constructed in the second half of the 19th century at Agincourt. One was built just west of the crossroads as part of the Toronto and Nipissing Railway line heading north from Scarborough Junction on the Toronto – Montreal mainline, and greatly improved access. The line eventually became part of Canadian National Railways, and the station operates today as Agincourt Station on the GO Transit Stouffville commuter rail route. A second station was built east of the crossroads, northside of Sheppard Avenue and west of Brimley Road, on what is today CP Rail track that runs from downtown Toronto diagonally northeast through the neighbourhood. Commuter rail service to Toronto's Union Station was offered by the CPR from various service routes such as Lake Ontario Shore Line and Toronto-Peterboro Dayliner (1950s). CP passenger service was discontinued in 1982 but revived briefly in 1985 before being cancelled for good in 1990. The line branches east of a marshalling yard, built by CP in the 1960s between McCowan and Markham Roads on the east of the neighbourhood, into the (Peterborough–) Havelock and Belleville (– Montreal) subdivisions.

Agincourt saw an influx of Hong Kong Chinese and Taiwanese emigrants during the 1980s, especially in the area along Sheppard Avenue near Midland Avenue.  Since the development of Chinese-themed shopping centres in the 1980s, it has become a booming suburban Toronto Chinatown and was the vanguard for the proliferation of "Chinese malls", catering specifically to the Chinese community across the GTA.

Education

Four public school boards operate elementary and secondary schools in Agincourt. They include the public secular Toronto District School Board (TDSB), and the public separate school boards, Conseil scolaire catholique MonAvenir (CSCM), and the Toronto Catholic District School Board (TCDSB). Toronto's French-language secular public school board, Conseil scolaire Viamonde (CSV) now operates a school in the district.

TDSB operates four public secondary schools in the neighbourhood, Agincourt Collegiate Institute, Albert Campbell Collegiate Institute, Sir William Osler High School and Delphi Alternative Secondary School. In addition to secondary schools, TDSB also operates institutions which provide primary education. TCDSB operates two public secondary schools in Agincourt, Francis Libermann Catholic High School and Monsignor Fraser College Midland Campus, with the latter housed in the former Our Lady of Good Counsel Catholic School.

The following public elementary schools operate in Agincourt (with the managing school board in parenthesis):

 Agincourt Junior Public School (TDSB)
 C. D. Farquharson Junior Public School (TDSB)
 Chartland Junior Public School (TDSB)
 École elémentaire catholique Saint-Jean-de-Lalande (CSCM)
 École elémentaire Laure-Riese (CSV)
 Henry Kelsey Senior Public School (TDSB)
 North Agincourt Junior Public School (TDSB)
 Sir Alexander Mackenzie Senior Public School (TDSB)
 St. Bartholomew Catholic School (TCDSB)
 St. Elizabeth Seton Catholic Elementary School (TCDSB)
 St. Ignatius of Loyola Catholic School (TCDSB)
 White Haven Junior Public School (TDSB)

Recreation

The neighbourhood is home to a number of municipal parks, managed by the Toronto Parks, Forestry and Recreation Division. In addition to local parks, the Division also operates the Agincourt Recreation Centre (pool and ice rink - damaged in fire in January 2019), located adjacent to Agincourt Park, Albert Campbell Pool (inside Albert Campbell CI) and Commander Park Arena (ice rink) at Commander Park.

 Agincourt Park
 Alexmuir Park
 Brimley Woods Park
 Chartland Park
 Chartwell Park
 Collingwood Park
 Donalda Park
 Farquharson Park
 Havendale Park
 Iroquois Park
 Knott Park
 Metrogate Park
 McDairmid Woods Park
 North Agincourt Park
 Snowhill Park
 White Haven Park

See also
J. K. L. Ross, operator of Agincourt Farms, a thoroughbred farm once located in Agincourt

References

External links

City of Toronto – Agincourt South-Malvern West Neighbourhood Profile
City of Toronto – Agincourt North Neighbourhood Profile

Neighbourhoods in Toronto
Scarborough, Toronto
Chinatowns in Canada